Chen Wenzhong (born 29 August 1970 in Guangxi) is a former Chinese sprinter who competed in the men's 100m competition at the 1996 Summer Olympics. He recorded a 10.37, enough to qualify for the next round past the heats. In round two, he recorded a 10.29, beneath the minimum to advance. His personal best is 10.20, set in 1996. He also competed in that Olympiad's 200m competition, scoring a 21.05 in the first heat.

References

1970 births
Chinese male sprinters
Athletes (track and field) at the 1996 Summer Olympics
Olympic athletes of China
Living people
Asian Games medalists in athletics (track and field)
Asian Games silver medalists for China
Asian Games bronze medalists for China
Athletes (track and field) at the 1994 Asian Games
Medalists at the 1994 Asian Games
Runners from Guangxi
20th-century Chinese people